Young Jonn is a Nigerian singer, songwriter and record producer, currently signed to Chocolate City Music. He is also known for his hit singles Dada and the remix with Davido. He had music production credits on industry hits during the 2010s and was affiliated with the YBNL mafia family going on to be ranked #3  in The NETs list of "Nigeria's Top 7 Biggest Music Producers" and went on to be nominated in the "Producer of The Year" at the 2015 Nigeria Entertainment Awards and The Headies 2015.

Early life and education
Jonn was born into a Christian family of Akwa Ibom descent in Ibadan, the capital of Oyo State, Jonn had his basic formal education at Ideal Foundation Primary School, Ibadan and GOF College, Osogbo, Osun State. During his high school days in Osogbo, he had interest in Basketball, Soccer, Musical Instruments, Miming and Dance. He studied Communication and Language Arts at the University of Ibadan.

Career
Jonn started playing musical instrument as a child. He formed a group called AVG along with his brothers before he got signed to Hit Factory Studio in 2012. While working as producer at Hit Factory, he produced a chart-topping single by Olamide titled "Story For The Gods". He was nominated for "Producer of The Year" at the 2015 edition of The Headies for his work on "Bobo", a song by Olamide which rose to critical acclaim.

Jonn has been credited for producing songs like "Gbese" and "Efejoku" by Lil Kesh, "Biggest Backside" by Davido and album credits including The Baddest by Davido, 2 Kings by Olamide and Phyno and Eyan Mayweather by Olamide. 

In 2022, Young Jonn closed a deal with Chocolate City, with the release of "Dada", off his first extended play, Love Is Not Enough (Vol. 1), which was released on 1 April 2022. On 21st of October, 2022, Young Jonn released "Love is Not Enough" (Vol. 2).This project contained already-released Dada Remix, Normally, Next to You, Xtra Cool and If You Leave and Sokoto.

Discography
EPs

 Love Is Not Enough (Vol 1)
 Love Is Not Enough (Vol 2)

SINGLES

 Dada
 Dada Remix feat Davido
 Normally 
 Xtra Cool

Selected production credits

Awards and nominations

References 

1995 births
Living people
People from Akwa Ibom State
Nigerian hip hop record producers